The St. Cloud Commercial Historic District is a designation applied to the historic downtown of St. Cloud, Minnesota, United States.  It comprises 41 contributing properties built between 1870 and 1947.  It was listed as a historic district on the National Register of Historic Places in 1998 for having local significance in the theme of commerce.  It was nominated for being St. Cloud's long-serving economic center and the heart of the city.

See also

 National Register of Historic Places listings in Stearns County, Minnesota

References

Buildings and structures in St. Cloud, Minnesota
Commercial buildings on the National Register of Historic Places in Minnesota
Historic districts on the National Register of Historic Places in Minnesota
National Register of Historic Places in Stearns County, Minnesota